Lewald Glacier is a small glacier  west of Cape Vahsel, flowing northward to the coast at the east end of South Georgia. It was named by the Second German Antarctic Expedition, 1911–12, under Wilhelm Filchner, for Theodor Lewald, Ministerialdirektor im Reichsamt des Innern, Germany, who took an active interest in the expedition.

See also
 List of glaciers in the Antarctic
 Glaciology

References

Glaciers of South Georgia